All American Aviation was an airline company founded by Lytle Schooler Adams in 1937.  It evolved over the decades to become Allegheny Airlines, then USAir and subsequently US Airways, with the latter's merger with American Airlines in 2013 creating  the largest airline in the world.

History
All American Aviation was founded in 1937 as a patent holding company. Its sister company, Tri-State Aviation, was founded on the same date, serving as the physical operating company. Founder Lytle Schooler Adams was the first president of both companies.

Adams had started experimenting with an airmail pick-up system in 1927, developing numerous patents on the system, which he rolled into All American Aviation in 1937. Initial flights of the airline pick-up service were made by a Stinson Reliant single engine high-wing monoplane.  Mail containers were suspended from ropes or cables suspended from two poles.  The aircraft swooped down with a suspended hook hanging below and snagged the rope or cable. This was further developed in a system that could pick up personnel.

The du Pont family brothers Richard C. du Pont and Alexis Felix du Pont, Jr. bought stock in the company in 1938—on the same date as a bill was passed in Congress to enable the U.S. Post Office to start large scale experimentation on the airmail pick-up system. Through some manipulations, the du Ponts were able to acquire majority stock and voted Richard du Pont as the new president.

Actual service did not commence until 1939. The pioneering experimental airmail pickup service was built on routes radiating from a hub at Pittsburgh, Pennsylvania, from which the airline provided service throughout the Ohio River valley.

All American received a certificate of public convenience and necessity from the Civil Aeronautics Board for regular passenger, mail and express service.  Concurrent with the introduction of passenger service, the company changed its name in 1949 to All American Airways.

Through the years, the company grew and the name was again changed, becoming Allegheny Airlines on January 1, 1953, USAir on October 28, 1979, and US Airways on November 12, 1996.  Following its 2013 merger with American Airlines, the US Airways brand was phased out by 2016 as planes, uniforms, and other assets were steadily rebranded to American Airlines.

Fleet
Pre World War II
Stinson SM-1D-300
Stinson SR-10C (4)
Post World War II
Douglas DC-3
Convair 580

See also
 List of defunct airlines of the United States
 Fulton surface-to-air recovery system

References

External links
 The George J. Frebert collection on Delaware Aviation  at Hagley Museum and Library  includes material on All American Aviation and its air mail pick-up system.

Airlines established in 1937
Airlines disestablished in 1952
Companies based in Pittsburgh
Defunct airlines of the United States
Defunct companies based in Pennsylvania
US Airways Group
American companies established in 1937
Airlines based in Pennsylvania
Aviation companies